Alexandru Barabas Matei Guiman (born 1980) is a Romanian water polo player. At the 2012 Summer Olympics, he competed for the Romania men's national water polo team in the men's event. He is 6 ft 3 inches tall.

See also
 Romania men's Olympic water polo team records and statistics

References

External links
 

Romanian male water polo players
1980 births
Living people
Olympic water polo players of Romania
Water polo players at the 2012 Summer Olympics